The 2015 edition of the Canadian Polaris Music Prize was presented on September 21, 2015 at The Carlu event theatre in Toronto, Ontario. The event was hosted by children's entertainer Fred Penner.

In May 2015, Slaight Communications announced an additional contribution to the Polaris fund which saw the prize for the winning album increased to $50,000, as well as $3,000 to each of the non-winning nominees.

Shortlist

The ten-album shortlist was announced on July 16.

Longlist

The prize's preliminary 40-album longlist was announced on June 16 at the Carleton Music Bar and Grill in Halifax, Nova Scotia.

Heritage Prize
In 2015, the Polaris committee also launched the Heritage Prize, an awards program to honour classic Canadian albums released before the creation of the Polaris Prize. Each year four shortlists of albums from four historical periods in Canadian music will be released, following which a public online vote will choose which album to honour. These will be announced separately from the main Polaris Prize.

The winners for 2015 were announced on October 9. The four winning albums will be honoured with a tribute concert in Toronto in early 2016, a trophy and the sale of a limited edition commemorative print.

1960s-1970s
 Joni Mitchell, Blue
The Band, Music from Big Pink
Robert Charlebois and Louise Forestier, Lindberg
Leonard Cohen, Songs of Leonard Cohen
Jackie Shane, Jackie Shane Live

1980s
 Cowboy Junkies, The Trinity Session
Glenn Gould, Bach: The Goldberg Variations
Daniel Lanois, Acadie
Maestro Fresh Wes, Symphony in Effect
Mary Margaret O'Hara, Miss America
Rush, Moving Pictures

1990s
 Sloan, Twice Removed
Blue Rodeo, Five Days in July
Bran Van 3000, Glee
Dream Warriors, And Now the Legacy Begins
Lhasa de Sela, La llorona

2000-2005
 Peaches, The Teaches of Peaches
Arcade Fire, Funeral
Broken Social Scene, You Forgot It in People
Constantines, Shine a Light
Feist, Let It Die

References

External links
 Polaris Music Prize

2015 in Canadian music
2015 music awards
2015